Taechon Northwest Airport(태천비행장) is an airport in Pyongan-bukto, North Korea.  It is 14 km northwest of the main Taechon Airport and also 15 km northeast of Panghyon Airport.

Facilities 
The airfield has a single grass runway 05/23 measuring 2600 x 161 feet (792 x 49 m).

References 

Airports in North Korea
North Pyongan